Mariana dos Santos Almeida (born 24 February 1998)  is a Brazilian women's association football forward, who plays for Beşiktaş in Turkey with jersey number 25.

Early life 
Mariana dos Santos Almeida was born in Rio de Janeiro , Brazil on 24 February 1998.

Playing career 
She played in her country for the clubs CR Vasco da Gama (2016), AAD Vitória das Tabocas (2018), AA Ponte Preta (2019). She was with Botafogo FR, before she became a member of Cruzeiro EC (2020–2021), Her contract with Cruzeiro EC was renewed under the condition that she will be loaned out to the Istanbul-based club Beşiktaş J.K. She will return to Brazil after the 2021–22 Turkcell Super League season. She joined Beşiktaş J.K. in the beginning of August 2021, and played in two matches of the 2021–22 UEFA Women's Champions League qualifying rounds. On 10 March 2022, she left Turkey.

References 

1998 births
Living people
Footballers from Rio de Janeiro (city)
Brazilian women's footballers
Women's association football forwards
Brazilian expatriate women's footballers
Expatriate women's footballers in Turkey
Brazilian expatriate sportspeople in Turkey
Beşiktaş J.K. women's football players
Turkish Women's Football Super League players
CR Vasco da Gama (women) players